Brian Witherspoon (born June 5, 1985) is an American track and field runner and former American football cornerback and return specialist. He was signed by the Jacksonville Jaguars  as an undrafted free agent in 2008. He played college football at Stillman.

Professional career

2008 NFL Combine

Jacksonville Jaguars
Witherspoon was signed by the Jacksonville Jaguars as an undrafted free agent in 2008.

He tore his ACL for a second straight season during offseason practices with the Giants, and was waived/injured on May 24.

Witherspoon has also played for the Detroit Lions, Carolina Panthers and New York Giants.

Witherspoon is currently a sales representative at Unifirst Corp 2016.

Track and field
In July 2013, Witherspoon retired from football to be a full-time track and field runner. He qualified for the US Track & Field Nationals in both the 100 meters, with a time of 10.22 seconds, and 200 meters, with a time of 20.66 seconds.

Personal bests

References

External links
Detroit Lions bio
Jacksonville Jaguars bio

1985 births
Living people
People from Butler, Alabama
Players of American football from Alabama
American football cornerbacks
American football return specialists
Stillman Tigers baseball players
Stillman Tigers football players
Jacksonville Jaguars players
Detroit Lions players
Carolina Panthers players
New York Giants players
African-American male track and field athletes
American male sprinters
21st-century African-American sportspeople
20th-century African-American people